T. G. Scarbrough was an American football coach. He served as the head football coach at the University of Mississippi (Ole Miss) in 1898. During his one-season tenure at Ole Miss, Scarbrough compiled an overall record of one win and one loss (1–1).

Head coaching record

References

Year of birth missing
Year of death missing
Ole Miss Rebels football coaches